Scrobipalpa hyssopi is a moth in the family Gelechiidae. It was described by Jacques Nel in 2003. It is found in the Hautes-Alpes of southern France.

The larvae feed on Hyssopus officinalis.

References

Scrobipalpa
Moths described in 2003